Hudson was a city that existed in Hudson County, New Jersey, United States, from 1855 to 1870, when it became part of Jersey City.

History
Hudson Town, a predecessor of Hudson City, was formed by an Act of the New Jersey Legislature on April 12, 1852, from portions of North Bergen Township.

Hudson City itself was incorporated on April 11, 1855, from portions of Hudson Town and North Bergen Township.

On May 2, 1870, both Hudson City and Bergen City were annexed by Jersey City and is known by the people of Jersey City as only the Heights.. The former Hudson City is now The Heights section of the city.

Notable residents
 Edwin R. V. Wright, Mayor of Hudson City in 1855, who represented New Jersey's 5th congressional district from 1865-1867.

References

Former towns in New Jersey
Former cities in New Jersey
History of Jersey City, New Jersey
Former municipalities in Hudson County, New Jersey
1855 establishments in New Jersey